The Qalamoun Mountains are the northeastern portion of the Anti-Lebanon Mountains, and they are northeast of the Syrian capital Damascus. They run from Barada River Valley in the southwest to the city of Hisyah in the northeast.

Western Qalamoun
The Qalamoun Mountains are home to many cities such as:

Homs District
Bureij
Hisyah
Al-Tall District
Al-Tall
al-Dreij
Halboun
Maaraba
Maarat Saidnaya
Manin
Rankous
Saidnaya
Talfita

Yabroud District
Yabroud
Assal al-Ward
Bakhah
Ras al-Maara
An-Nabek District
al-Jarajir
Al-Nabek
Deir Atiyah
Flita
Qara
al-Qastal
Al-Sahel
Al-Qutayfah District
Ain al-Tinah
Jubaadin
Maaloula

The peak of the Qalamoun Mountains host the Cherubim Monastery at Saidnaya.

Eastern Qalamoun

Some of the cities located on the eastern part are:
Al-Qutayfah District
al-Naseriyah
Al-Qutayfah
Al-Ruhaybah
Jayrud
Muadamiyat al-Qalamoun
Douma District
al-Dumayr

See also
 Battle of Qalamoun (2013)
 Qalamoun offensive (June–August 2014)
 Qalamoun offensive (May–June 2015)
 Qalamoun offensive (July–August 2017)
 Evacuation of rebels from eastern Qalamoun

References

Mountain ranges of Syria